Nephu is an R&B group of four members, who go by the stage names Shawn, Gabe, Mack, and Armand. They were signed with the IBM Music Group.

Nephu has released the singles "Weather Man" and "Letter". Nephu had recorded the song "Same Girl", however the record was instead passed over to R. Kelly. Nephu was also featured on a song with Cherish entitled "He said, She Said."

References

External links
Nephu on MySpace
Nephu on Myspace (music profile)
Nephu at Last.fm

American contemporary R&B musical groups